Joseph Robert Cistone (May 18, 1949 – October 16, 2018) was an American prelate of the Roman Catholic Church who served as the sixth bishop of the Diocese of Saginaw in Michigan from 2009 to until his death in 2018.

Biography

Early life and education 
Joseph Cistone was born on May 18, 1949, in Philadelphia, Pennsylvania, to Daniel A. and Josephine R. (née Altomare) Cistone, Sr. One of three children, he has two brothers, Daniel and Anthony. He attended Our Lady of Consolation School and graduated from Father Judge High School, both in Philadelphia. After graduating from high school in 1967, Cistone entered St. Charles Borromeo Seminary in Wynnewood, Pennsylvania, receiving a Bachelor of Philosophy degree in 1971 and a Master of Divinity degree in 1975.

Priesthood 
Cistone was ordained to the priesthood for the Archdiocese of Philadelphia by Cardinal John Krol on May 17, 1975. After his ordination, Cistone was posted as parochial vicar at Epiphany of Our Lord Parish in Philadelphia.  He also became chaplain at St. Maria Goretti High School in Philadelphia in 1977.  Cistone left these two posts in 1979 to became parochial vicar at St. Jerome Parish in Philadelphia. He was named in 1980 as an advocate on the metropolitan tribunal.

From 1982 to 1987, Cistone served as parochial vicar at St. Jude Parish in Chalfont, Pennsylvania, as a board member for the archdiocesan Permanent Diaconate Program, and as Newman Chaplain at Delaware Valley College of Science in Doylestown, Pennsylvania.  He was also named defender of the bond on the metropolitan tribunal in 1983, then in 1987 became parochial vicar at St. Francis of Assisi Parish in Norristown, Pennsylvania.  Cistone was moved from St. Francis in 1989 to St. Bernard Parish in Philadelphia.  In 1991, Cistone left his other positions to become dean of formation  for the Theology Division of St. Charles Seminary.

Cistone was named as an associate to Monsignor Edward Cullen, vicar for administration of the archdiocese in 1993. He later served as assistant vicar for administration from 1994 to 1998, and vicar general and vicar for administration from 1998 to 2009. Cistone was raised by the Vatican to the rank of honorary prelate of his holiness in April 1998.

Auxiliary Bishop of Philadelphia 
On June 28, 2004, Cistone was appointed as an auxiliary bishop of the Archdiocese of Philadelphia and titular bishop of Casae Medianae by Pope John Paul II. Cistone received his episcopal consecration on July 28, 2004, from Cardinal Justin Rigali, with Bishops Robert Maginnis and Michael Burbidge serving as co-consecrators, in Philadelphia at the Cathedral-Basilica of Sts. Peter and Paul. Cistone selected as his episcopal motto: "Father of mercy and love".

In addition to his duties as vicar general and vicar for administration, Cistone served as head of the Secretariat for Catholic Human Services and the Secretariat for Temporal Services. He also had pastoral oversight for parishes in South Philadelphia and a portion of Delaware County, Pennsylvania.

Bishop of Saginaw
Cistone was appointed as the sixth bishop of the Diocese of Saginaw by Pope Benedict XVI on May 20, 2009. Succeeding Bishop  Robert J. Carlson, Cistone was installed on July 28, 2009. Within the United States Conference of Catholic Bishops (USCCB) Cistone was a member of the Committee for Protection of Children and Young People, the Committee for Cultural Diversity in the Church, the Subcommittee for African-American Affairs, and the Committee on Budget and Finance.

In 2011, Cistone appointed a 19-member commission to make recommendations about parish closings.  In January 2013, Cistone announced that the number of parishes would be reduced from 105 to 56. "I saw a need to position ourselves in a way by which parish communities are re-invigorated, liturgically alive and actively engaged in outreach to those in need." Many parishioners were angered by the closures, with some participating in protests. Several retired priests also opposed the closures.  According to one priest, the diocese lost 5,000 parishioners between 2013 and 2015.

Joseph Cistone died of lung cancer at his home in Saginaw on October 16, 2018 at age 69.

Sexual abuse scandal

According to a 2005 grand jury investigation into clergy sexual abuse, while serving as assistant vicar for administration in 1996, Cistone was involved with silencing a nun who tried to alert parishioners at St. Gabriel parish about abuse by a priest. A week after being named to lead the Diocese of Saginaw, Cistone was asked by a mid-Michigan newspaper reporter about the grand jury investigation and his reported role in covering up instances of sexual abuse. Cistone expressed unhappiness with how little opportunity he had been given to respond to the report, saying, "Unfortunately, the grand jury procedure, as followed in Philadelphia, did not allow for any opportunity to address such questions to offer explanation or clarification." Cistone also expressed surprise that he had not been questioned about the grand jury report during his introductory press conference and told the reporter, "Had it come up, I certainly would have addressed it." However, when given the opportunity to answer questions about his actions by the newspaper reporter, Cistone refused to answer specific questions on the matter.

In August 2012, Cistone was named in a lawsuit surrounding clergy sex abuse allegations at his former assignment in Philadelphia. Press reports indicate that he admitted that in 1994 he watched as Church records with the names of abusers were shredded.

Deland Case 
On March 1, 2018, Cistone suspended Reverend Robert Deland, a priest of St. Agnes Parish in Freeland, Michigan, from all of his priestly duties.  Deland had been arrested by police on February 26, 2018 on charges of sexually assaulting a teenager. In March 2018, Saginaw police searched Cistone's residence for evidence in unspecified sexual abuse case. Prosecutors said they took this step due to a lack of cooperation from the diocese.  Cistone said that he was unaware of the investigation.  The police also searched the chancery office and the cathedral rectory.

On April 19, 2018, Cistone appointed Michigan Judge Michael J. Talbot as an independent delegate to take charge of all sexual abuse cases in the diocese.  In September 2018, Deland pleaded no contest to reduced charges; he was sent to state prison, spending two years there.

See also
 

 Catholic Church hierarchy
 Catholic Church in the United States
 Historical list of the Catholic bishops of the United States
 List of Catholic bishops of the United States
 Lists of patriarchs, archbishops, and bishops

References

External links
 Roman Catholic Diocese of Saginaw Official Site
Office of Bishop Cistone
Cardinal Rigali's Homily at Cistone's Episcopal Ordination

1949 births
2018 deaths
Clergy from Philadelphia
21st-century Roman Catholic bishops in the United States
St. Charles Borromeo Seminary alumni
Roman Catholic bishops of Saginaw
Deaths from cancer in Michigan
Deaths from lung cancer